Grace Christian College (GCC), formerly known as Grace Christian High School (GCHS), is an evangelical Protestant school that caters primarily to Chinese Filipino students and provides education from Pre-Nursery to College. It is situated in Grace Village, Quezon City, Metro Manila, Philippines. Its current president is Dr. Christine Joy Tan, succeeding Dr. James L. Tan in May 2020.

History 
The school formally opened as Grace Christian High School on July 5, 1950 at Nagtahan Street in San Miguel, Manila, by a Chinese educator Mrs. Julia L. Tan and American Baptist missionaries Dr. and Mrs. Edwin G. Spahr. In 1966, the school moved to its present location in the newly developed Grace Village, Quezon City, to accommodate an increasing student population while donating the Nagtahan location to Grace Bible Church for its Christian Academy of Manila. Inauguration for the new campus was held on September 10, 1966. Two years after, the school bought more properties inside Grace Village for further expansion.

Curriculum 
The school uses the A BEKA Curriculum in English, Science and Bible.

Clubs and Organizations 
Art Club, Student Community Service, Chess Club, Robotics Club, English Club, Filipino Club, Grace Mathineers, Glee Club, Grace Chinese and Western Orchestra, Herodotus Society (History), Grace Journal, Morning Devotion, Music Club, "Positive" Science Club, Snapshot Society, Astronomy Club, Grace Student Council, and the Grace College Student Council.

Notable alumni 
Alfrancis Chua - sports executive and former basketball coach.
Win Gatchalian (1991) – politician.
Hayden Kho - cosmetic surgeon, actor, entrepreneur.
Wilson Lee Flores (1983) - writer, a college professor, a real estate entrepreneur, economics and geopolitics analyst, art collector and a public speaker.
David Licauco - actor, model.
Bonnie Tan - basketball coach.

Chinese education 
Kindergarten, elementary and high school students hold their Chinese classes in the afternoon (after English classes).  Except for several sections in second year high, which they held their Chinese classes in the morning (2-4, 2–5, 2–6, 2–7).  The Chinese curriculum consists of eight subjects – Chinese Language  (華語), Chinese Phonetics (國音), Chinese Composition (作文), Chinese Conversation (會話), Chinese Literature (閱讀), Chinese Computer (電腦)(for highschool), Chinese Writing (寫子), Chinese Culture  (綜合) (for Kinder), and Chinese Mathematics (數學) (for kinder).

Sister schools
Source

Taiwan
Tam-Kang Senior High School 淡水高級中學- Tamsui, Taipei
National Taiwan Normal University 國立臺灣師範大學 - Taipei
Chung Yuan Christian University 中原大學 - Zhongli District, Taoyuan City
Chang Jung Christian University 長榮大學 - Tainan
Northern Taiwan Institute of Science and Technology 北台科學技術學院 - Kwantu
Aletheia University 真理大學 - Tamsui, New Taipei City and Madou District, Tainan

South Korea
Yumkwang Christian School 염광고등학교 鹽光學院 - Seoul, South Korea
Hannam University 한남대학교 韓南大學 -  Daejeon, South Korea
Yeodo Private Elementary School 여도초등학교 麗都私立小學 - Yeosu, South Jeolla Province, South Korea

Indonesia
Sekolah Kristen Tri Tunggal  (Tri Tunggal Christian School) – Semarang, Central Java

References

External links 
Grace Christian College official website

High schools in Metro Manila
Chinese-language schools in Metro Manila
Universities and colleges in Quezon City
Protestant schools in the Philippines
Universities and colleges in Metro Manila
Chinese-language schools in the Philippines
1950 establishments in the Philippines
Educational institutions established in 1950